The extension of a predicatea truth-valued functionis the set of tuples of values that, used as arguments, satisfy the predicate. Such a set of tuples is a relation.

Examples
For example, the statement "d2 is the weekday following d1" can be seen as a truth function associating to each tuple (d2, d1) the value true or false. The extension of this truth function is, by convention, the set of all such tuples associated with the value true, i.e.

 {(Monday, Sunday),
  (Tuesday, Monday),
  (Wednesday, Tuesday),
  (Thursday, Wednesday),
  (Friday, Thursday),
  (Saturday, Friday),
  (Sunday, Saturday)}

By examining this extension we can conclude that "Tuesday is the weekday following Saturday" (for example) is false.

Using set-builder notation, the extension of the n-ary predicate  can be written as

Relationship with characteristic function
If the values 0 and 1 in the range of a characteristic function are identified with the values false and true, respectivelymaking the characteristic function a predicate, then for all relations R and predicates  the following two statements are equivalent:
 is the characteristic function of R
R is the extension of

See also 
 Extensional logic
 Extensional set
 Extensionality
 Intension

References
 extension (semantics) in nLab

Predicate logic